Mühlhausen is a city in Thuringia, Germany.

Mühlhausen, German for "mill houses", may also refer to:
German naval ship Mühlhausen, in service with the German Navy
other places in Germany:
Mühlhausen (Affing), village in the municipality Affing near Augsburg, Bavaria, Germany
Mühlhausen (Kraichgau), municipality in Baden-Württemberg, Germany
Mühlhausen am Neckar, a town now part of the Stuttgart conglomerate in Baden-Württemberg
Mühlhausen bei Schwenningen, community of Villingen-Schwenningen in southern Baden-Württemberg, Germany
Mühlhausen, Middle Franconia, in the district of Erlangen-Höchstadt, Bavaria
Mühlhausen, Upper Palatinate, in the district of Neumarkt, Bavaria
places outside Germany:
Mühlhausen an der Moldau, the former German name of Nelahozeves, Czech Republic
Mühlhausen, the former German name of Milevsko, Czech Republic
Mühlhausen in Ostpreußen, the former German name of Młynary, Poland
Mühlhausen (Kreis Preußisch Eylau), today Gvardeyskoye, Kaliningrad Oblast, Russia
Mülhausen, the German name for Mulhouse, France
Mulhausen, Bas-Rhin, village in France